Proti is a village and a former municipality in the Serres regional unit, Greece. Since the 2011 local government reform it is part of the municipality Amphipoli, of which it is a municipal unit. The municipal unit has an area of 79.241 km2. The population of the municipal unit was 2,044 at the 2011 census.

Near Proti has been found an archaeological site that is probably identified with the Roman station of Egnatia Domeros. From here comes also various ancient inscriptions, among which a Latin inscription that mentions the inhabitants of two ancient settlements (i.e. "Montani" and "Suritani").

Notable people 
Konstantinos Karamanlis (1907–1998) conservative politician, four-time prime minister and twice president of Greece
Kostas Karamanlis (1956–) conservative politician, twice time prime minister of Greece
Christos Govetas, master Greek traditional musician, singer and recording artist, based in Seattle since the 1980s.

References

Populated places in Serres (regional unit)
Archaeological sites in Macedonia (Greece)